Yevgeny Kafelnikov and Andrei Olhovskiy were the defending champions but only Olhovskiy competed that year with Brett Steven.

Olhovskiy and Steven won in the final 6–4, 6–3 against David Prinosil and Daniel Vacek.

Seeds

  David Adams /  Marius Barnard (semifinals)
  David Prinosil /  Daniel Vacek (final)
  Olivier Delaître /  Fabrice Santoro (semifinals)
  Max Mirnyi /  Kevin Ullyett (first round)

Draw

References
 1997 St. Petersburg Open Doubles Draw

St. Petersburg Open
1997 ATP Tour
1997 in Russian tennis